The 12th Pennsylvania House of Representatives District is in western Pennsylvania and, as of 2023, is represented by Republican Stephenie Scialabba.

District profile
The 12th Pennsylvania House of Representatives District is located in Butler County and includes the following areas: 

Adams Township
Callery
Cranberry Township
Evans City
Harmony
Jackson Township
Mars
Seven Fields
Valencia
Zelienople

Representatives

Recent election results

References

External links
District map from the United States Census Bureau
Pennsylvania House Legislative District Maps from the Pennsylvania Redistricting Commission.  
Population Data for District 12 from the Pennsylvania Redistricting Commission.

Government of Butler County, Pennsylvania
12
Government of Allegheny County, Pennsylvania